Gaar Corner is an Unincorporated community in the U.S. state of Oklahoma.
Gaar Corner is located in western Pontotoc County on State Highway 19, east of Stratford. While Gaar Corner is not shown on the official state map, it is marked by official ODOT place-name signs along SH-19.

References

Unincorporated communities in Pontotoc County, Oklahoma
Unincorporated communities in Oklahoma